Danish national cycle route 4, is the fourth of the 11 Danish National Cycle Routes. It runs from Søndervig in West Jutland to Copenhagen on the island Zealand.

Towns on the route

See also
Danish National Cycle Routes

External links
Website of Vejdirektoratet - the Danish Road Directorate
CykelGuide – National cycle routes in Denmark  (pdf file)

Cycleways in Denmark
Transport in Aarhus
Transport in the Central Denmark Region
Transport in Region Zealand
Transport in the Capital Region of Denmark